U.S. Highway 285 (US 285) travels from Sanderson, Texas to Denver, Colorado. In Texas, US 285 begins at an intersection with US 90 in Sanderson, traveling through Fort Stockton and Pecos before exiting the state into New Mexico between Pecos and Carlsbad.

Route description
US 285 begins at an intersection with U.S. Route 90 in Sanderson, just west of the downtown area. The highway travels through highly rural areas of Terrell and Pecos County before entering Fort Stockton. In Fort Stockton, US 285 shares a short overlap with U.S. Route 385 and meets Interstate 10 before leaving the town. US 285 has an interchange with Farm to Market Road 1776, which serves the Firestone Tire and Rubber Company test track. After FM 1776, US 285 takes on a highly rural route until entering Pecos, where the highway meets with Interstate 20. US 285 briefly runs through Culberson County before crossing the state line into New Mexico.

Junction list

References

Transportation in Terrell County, Texas
Transportation in Pecos County, Texas
Transportation in Reeves County, Texas
Transportation in Culberson County, Texas
 Texas
85-2